Douglas George Gawler (9 November 1860 – 6 May 1915) was an Australian lawyer and politician who was a member of the Legislative Council of Western Australia from 1910 until his death, representing Metropolitan-Suburban Province.

Gawler was born in Adelaide, South Australia, to Caroline (née Philpot) and Henry Gawler. His grandfather, George Gawler, was the second Governor of South Australia. Gawler attended St Peter's College, Adelaide, and then studied law at the University of Adelaide. Gawler was called to the bar in South Australia in 1886, and left for Western Australia later that year, establishing his own firm in Perth. At one time, he was in partnership with Robert Bruce Burnside, a future Supreme Court justice. Having previously served on the Peppermint Grove Road Board for a period, Gawler was elected to parliament at a 1910 Legislative Council by-election, which had been caused by the resignation of Walter Kingsmill. He died in office in May 1915 (aged 54), of typhoid fever. He had married Eva Mary Waldeck in 1893, with whom he had four children.

References

1860 births
1915 deaths
Australian barristers
Australian people of English descent
Deaths from typhoid fever
Infectious disease deaths in Western Australia
Members of the Western Australian Legislative Council
People educated at St Peter's College, Adelaide
Politicians from Adelaide
Lawyers from Adelaide
University of Adelaide alumni
Western Australian local councillors